Slasti Otce vlasti  is a 1969 Czech comedy film directed by Karel Steklý.

Cast
 Jaromír Hanzlík as Kralevic Karel
 Miloš Kopecký as Jan Lucemburský
 Daniela Kolářová as Blanka z Valois

References

External links
 

1969 films
1960s historical comedy films
Czechoslovak comedy films
Films directed by Karel Steklý
Czech historical comedy films
1969 comedy films
1960s Czech films